Daniel Joseph Greene (1850 – December 12, 1911) was a Newfoundland politician who briefly served as the colony's Premier.

A native of St. John's, he studied law at Laval University and became a lawyer. Daniel Greene was first elected to the House of Assembly in 1875 and became Leader of the Opposition in 1887. In 1889 he became a minister in the government of Liberal Premier Sir William Whiteway. A year after the controversial 1893 elections Whiteway's government was dismissed by the governor Arthur Murray due to petitions alleging corrupt electoral practices. Murray appointed Tory leader Augustus F. Goodridge as the new premier and helped the minority government stay in office. However, Goodridge resigned in December 1894 after the collapse of two banks.

Greene had become acting Liberal leader due to the disbarment of Whiteway from holding electoral office. On December 13, 1894, following the collapse of Goodridge's government, Greene was sworn in as premier.

Green's government promptly passed the Disabilities Removal Act  allowing  candidates who had been disqualified because of election irregularities in 1893 to seek election again. Specifically, it allowed Whiteway to return as Premier which occurred on February 8, 1895 when Greene resigned.

He died in St. John's in 1911.

His nephew Joseph M. Greene also served in the Newfoundland House of Assembly from 1928 to 1932. Joseph Green's son, James Greene, was leader of the Opposition Conservative Party from 1960 to 1966.

See also 
Université Laval

References

External links
 

Premiers of Newfoundland Colony
Politicians from St. John's, Newfoundland and Labrador
1850 births
1911 deaths